The Multimedia Acceleration eXtensions or MAX are instruction set extensions to the Hewlett-Packard PA-RISC instruction set architecture (ISA). MAX was developed to improve the performance of multimedia applications that were becoming more prevalent during the 1990s.

MAX instructions operate on 32- or 64-bit SIMD data types consisting of multiple 16-bit integers packed in general purpose registers. The available functionality includes additions, subtractions and shifts.

The first version, MAX-1, was for the 32-bit PA-RISC 1.1 ISA. The second version, MAX-2, was for the 64-bit PA-RISC 2.0 ISA.

Notability 
The approach is notable because the set of instructions is much smaller than in other multimedia CPUs, and also more general-purpose. The small set and simplicity of the instructions reduce the recurring costs of the electronics, as well as the costs and difficulty of the design.  The general-purpose nature of the instructions increases their overall value. These instructions require only small changes to a CPU's arithmetic-logic unit. A similar design approach promises to be a successful model for the multimedia instructions of other CPU designs.  The set is also small because the CPU already included powerful shift and bit-manipulation instructions: "Shift pair" which shifts a pair of registers, "extract" and "deposit" of bit fields, and all the common bit-wise logical operations (and, or, exclusive-or, etc.).

This set of multimedia instructions has proven its performance, as well.  In 1996 the 64-bit "MAX-2" instructions enabled real-time performance of MPEG-1 and MPEG-2 video while increasing the area of a RISC CPU by only 0.2%.

Implementations 
MAX-1 was first implemented with the PA-7100LC in 1994. It is usually attributed as being the first SIMD extensions to an ISA. The second version, MAX-2, was for the 64-bit PA-RISC 2.0 ISA. It was first implemented in the PA-8000 microprocessor released in 1996.

The basic approach to the arithmetic in MAX-2 is to "interrupt the carries" between the 16-bit subwords, and choose between modular arithmetic, signed and unsigned saturation. This requires only small changes to the arithmetic logic unit.

MAX-1

MAX-2 

MAX-2 instructions are register-to-register instructions that operate on multiple integers in 64-bit quantities. All have a one cycle latency in the PA-8000 microprocessor and its derivatives. Memory accesses are via the standard 64-bit loads and stores.

The "MIX" and "PERMH" instructions are a notable innovation because they permute words in the register set without accessing memory.  This can substantially speed many operations.

References 

 Multimedia Acceleration eXtensions (MAX-1 and MAX-2) PA-RISC CPU Architecture OpenPA.net

Computer-related introductions in 1994
HP microprocessors
SIMD computing